Grebenhain is a municipality in the Vogelsbergkreis in Hesse, Germany.

Geography

Location
The municipality of Grebenhain lies from 400 to 733 m above sea level in the southeastern Vogelsberg Mountains, about 30 km west of Fulda.

Neighbouring communities
Grebenhain borders in the north on the town of Herbstein, in the east on the community of Hosenfeld (Fulda district), in the south on the communities of Freiensteinau and Birstein (Main-Kinzig-Kreis), in the southwest on the town of Gedern (Wetteraukreis), and in the west on the town of Schotten.

Constituent communities
The municipality consists of 15 centres named Bannerod, Bermuthshain, Crainfeld, Grebenhain (administrative seat), Hartmannshain, Heisters, Herchenhain, Ilbeshausen-Hochwaldhausen, Metzlos, Metzlos-Gehaag, Nösberts-Weidmoos, Vaitshain, Volkartshain, Wünschen-Moos und Zahmen.

History
The area nowadays occupied by the greater community of Grebenhain in the Vogelsberg was likely settled by waves of settlers from the Wetterau between the eighth and eleventh centuries as part of the expansion carried out in the High Middle Ages by the Abbots of Fulda.

The oldest place in today's municipal area is Crainfeld, which was alluded to as early as the ninth century in a Fulda donation announcement. The first definite and verifiable mention of Crainfeld, however, is in a king's document from 1012, which also mentions Bermuthshain and Ilbeshausen in a document for the first time.

Crainfeld advantageously lay at the crossroads of two important mediaeval trade roads, and was moreover until 1821 the seat of a court district, witnessed even today by the Edelhof, the Amt building used by the Oberschultheißen (roughly "sheriffs") when the Landgraves held sway in Hesse. The stately half-timbered house was built in 1685 by carpenter Hans Muth from Ilbeshausen. Hans Muth also built the Hansenmühle (or "Teufelsmühle" – "Devil's Mill") in Ilbeshausen in 1691, one of the loveliest half-timbered buildings in Upper Hesse. Crainfeld is furthermore still the seat of the parish even today. Until the State Highway (Staatsstraße), today's Bundesstraße 275, was built in 1834-1857, and the railway line in 1901-1906 through the neighbouring community of Grebenhain, Crainfeld was the region's main town.

The communities of Crainfeld, Grebenhain, Bermuthshain and Ilbeshausen have been Hessian since 1437 and formed until 1821 the court district of Crainfeld, which belonged to the Hessian Amt of Nidda. From 1852, they belonged to the Lauterbach district. The communities of Hartmannshain and Herchenhain have likewise been Hessian since 1437 and belonged to the court district of Burkhards. Until 1938, they were part of the Schotten district. The communities of Bannerod, Heisters, Zahmen, Wünschenmoos, Vaitshain, Nösberts, Weidmoos, Metzlos-Gehaag and Metzlos belonged until 1806 to the court districts of Altenschlirf and Moos, held by the Riedesel family. When the Riedesel state was mediatized, they became Hessian. The community of Volkartshain was until 1806 owned by the Counts of Stolberg-Gedern.

The main community of Grebenhain had its first documentary mention in a Riedesel document in 1338. Until the fifteenth century, iron ore was mined there, which is recalled today in the names Am Eisenberg (a hall) and Eisenbergsweg (a street), Eisen being German for "iron". In the west of the village, there was until 1789 a large manorial pond.

As part of Hesse's municipal reforms, the 13 formerly independent municipalities of Bannerod, Bermuthshain, Crainfeld, Grebenhain, Hartmannshain, Herchenhain, Ilbeshausen-Hochwaldhausen, Metzlos, Metzlos-Gehaag, Nösberts-Weidmoos, Steigertal (Heisters, Wünschenmoos, Zahmen), Vaitshain and Volkartshain had to merge on 1 January and 1 August 1972 into the greater community of Grebenhain.

Economy

Oberwaldklinik in Grebenhain
Vogelsbergklinik in Ilbeshausen-Hochwaldhausen
Robbe Modellsport in Metzlos-Gehaag

References

External links
 

Vogelsbergkreis
Grand Duchy of Hesse